Mozgowina  is a village in the administrative district of Gmina Dąbrowa Chełmińska, within Bydgoszcz County, Kuyavian-Pomeranian Voivodeship, in north-central Poland, on the Vistula river. It is located in the Chełmno Land in the historic region of Pomerania.

History
During the German occupation (World War II), in 1939, local Polish teachers were murdered by the Germans in a massacre of Poles committed in nearby Klamry as part of the Intelligenzaktion.

References

Populated places on the Vistula
Villages in Bydgoszcz County